Silas Edward Herbert Gill was an English-born Australian Methodist preacher.

Early life 
Silas Gill was born in East Sussex in England in 1806. His birth date is believed to be 24 December.

Gill married Mercy Catt in June 1826 and moved to Australia in the mid-1830s with four children.

Career 
After moving to the Kempsey area in 1859, Gill set up the Methodist Church of Kempsey. He ran it until a Methodist priest came to the area a few years later.

He is also credited with preaching in areas across Northern New South Wales.

He lost all of his possessions in a flood in 1864, but announced he had not lost his faith.

He did all of his religious work for free, and was never paid.

Death 
Silas Gill died suddenly on 10 September 1875, aged 68.

Honours 
The Gill Bridge over the Kempsey River bears his name.

Gill Street, Kempsey is also named after him.

References

1806 births
1875 deaths